Lavji Lakhamshi (1910-1972) was an Indian politician. He was a Member of Parliament, representing Gujarat in the Rajya Sabha the upper house of India's Parliament as a member of the  Indian National Congress.

References

Rajya Sabha members from Gujarat
Indian National Congress politicians
1910 births
1972 deaths